Ordeal by Innocence is a 1984 mystery film directed by Desmond Davis. It stars Donald Sutherland, Faye Dunaway, Christopher Plummer and Sarah Miles. It is based on the 1958 Agatha Christie novel Ordeal by Innocence.

Plot
Paleontologist Dr. Arthur Calgary visits the Argyle family to give them an address book that belongs to Jack Argyle. He is told that Jack was executed for the murder of his adoptive mother two years previously. Dr. Calgary can prove that Jack was innocent and restarts the investigation, with lethal consequences.

Cast
Donald Sutherland – Dr. Arthur Calgary
Faye Dunaway – Rachel Argyle
Christopher Plummer – Leo Argyle
Sarah Miles – Mary Durant
Ian McShane – Philip Durant
Diana Quick – Gwenda Vaughan
Annette Crosbie – Kirsten Lindstrom
Michael Elphick – Inspector Huish
George Innes – Archie Leach
Valerie Whittington – Hester Argyle
Phoebe Nicholls – Tina Argyle
Michael Maloney – Micky Argyle
Cassie Stuart – Maureen Clegg
Anita Carey – Martha Jessup
Ron Pember – Ferryman
Kevin Stoney – Solicitor
Brian Glover - Executioner

Release
The film was shown at Italy's Mystfest on 22 June 1984.

Reviews
Dave Brubeck's musical score for the film was heavily criticised as totally inappropriate for this style of mystery.
A timeout.com review stated "the film succeeds admirably in catching a feeling of repression and social conformity, and the idea of murder as a means of maintaining respectability rather than for gain or passion" and "a genuine '50s black thriller".

References

External links

1984 films
British mystery films
Films directed by Desmond Davis
Films based on works by Agatha Christie
Golan-Globus films
1980s English-language films
1980s British films